Into the Black may refer to;

 "Hey Hey, My My (Into the Black)", a song by Neil Young
 Into the Black (album), an album from Richie Kotzen
 Into the Black (novel), the second novel in the Beyond the Red science fiction trilogy, by Gabe (as Ava Jae)
 "Into the Black" (Sanctuary), a season three episode of Sanctuary